Oratha is a genus of moths in the family Geometridae erected by Francis Walker in 1863.

References

External links
 

Geometridae